Qinggil County (Uyghur), also Chinggil County, Qinghe County, is a county of Altay Prefecture in northeastern Xinjiang, China, bordering Bayan-Ölgii Province and Khovd Province in Mongolia to the east. Qinghe was the site of a meteorite impact in 1898 and a Mongolian–Chinese border clash in the spring of 1944.

Name
Qinggil County is named for the Qinggil River (青格里河), a tributary of the Ulungur River. 'Qinggil' is from Mongolian and means 'beautiful and crystal clear'.

History

In 1941/4, Qinggil County was established.

In 2012, Araltobe Township was made a town.

Administrative divisions 

Town (镇 / بازارلىق‎ / قالاشىع‎)
Qinggil Town (青河镇 Qinghe / چىڭگىل بازىرى / شىڭگىل قالاشىعى ), Takskhin Town (塔克什肯镇 Takeshiken / تاشقىن بازىرى / Тайкешкен  تايكەشكەن قالاشىعى ), Araltobe Town ( 阿热勒托别镇 Areletuobie / ئارالتۆپە بازىرى / Аралтөбе ارالتوبە قالاشىعى), Agedala Town (阿格达拉镇 / ئاقدالا بازىرى / اقدالا قالاشىعى), Aral Town ( Arele / ئارال بازىرى  / Арал ارال قالاشىعى )

Township (乡 / يېزا / اۋىل)
 Sartogay Township ( 萨尔托海乡 Sa'ertuohai / سارتوقاي يېزىسى / Сарытоғай болысы سارىتوعاي اۋىلى ), Qagan Hol Township (болысы  查干郭勒乡, Chaganguole /چاغانغۇل يېزىسى / Шағанғол شاعانعول اۋىلى), Agax Obo Township (阿尕什敖包乡 Agashi'aobao / ئاغاش ئوبا يېزىسى / Ағашоба болысы اعاشوبا اۋىلى)

Military Base (兵团单位)
Qinghe Farm (青河农场)

Climate

Economy
Qinggil County has forests as well as coal and mica. Industries include mining, livestock product processing, wool-spinning, leather-making and others. Animal husbandry is common.

Demographics

, 76.47% of the residents of the county were Kazakh, 18.27% were Han Chinese, and 5.26% were from other ethnic groups.

As of 2015, 50,091 of the 65,290 residents of the county were Kazakh, 11,892 were Han Chinese and 3,307 were from other ethnic groups.

As of 1997, 75.2% of the population of Qinggil County was Kazakh.

Wildlife
The Sino-Mongolian beaver, Castor fiber birulai, is found only in the basin of the Ulungur River. The population is considered endangered. The Bulgan Beaver Nature Reserve has been established on the Bulgan River (a tributary of the Ulungur River) in Qinggil (Qinghe) County in 1980 to protect the creatures.

See also
 45×90 points#45°N, 90°E
 , a mineral named for Qinggil County

References

External links
  Official website of Qinggil County government

County-level divisions of Xinjiang
Altay Prefecture